The women's taijiquan two events combined competition (Taijiquan and Taijijian) at the 2002 Asian Games in Busan, South Korea was held from 10 to 12 October at the Dongseo University Minseok Sports Center.

Schedule
All times are Korea Standard Time (UTC+09:00)

Results

References

2002 Asian Games Report, Page 795
Results

Women's taijiquan